Hudson Mindell Kitchell (1862–1944) was an early 20th-century American artist known primarily for his luminescent and tonalist landscapes.

Kitchell was a contemporary, friend and associate of Ralph Blakelock; Kitchell's use of color and heavy textures often led to his landscapes being compared to Blakelock's in style and composition. Kitchell painted throughout the United States but is most commonly associated with New York. He exhibited at the Society of Independent Artists in the 1920s.

References

1862 births
1944 deaths
19th-century American painters
American male painters
20th-century American painters
19th-century American male artists
20th-century American male artists